Jan Sovák (born February 13, 1953) is a Czech paleoartist and renowned painter currently living in Canada (since 1982). He has done many paintings for various scientists including paleontologist Phil Currie. Many of his paintings depict dinosaurs and other popular primeval organisms.

Sovák was born in Tábor in the former Czechoslovakia, and moved to Canada in 1982. His work has been published in over 170 books in more than fifteen languages. More than 40 museums around the world house examples of his art on prehistoric animals, and his illustrations also have appeared on educational television in twelve films on Discovery Channel Worldwide.

External links 
 http://www.troodonproductions.com/Authors.htm
 https://web.archive.org/web/20071107185025/http://www.wildprehistory.org/index.php?option=com_content&task=view&id=52&Itemid=76

Czech painters
Czech male painters
1953 births
People from Tábor
Czechoslovak emigrants to Canada
Czech illustrators
Paleoartists
Living people